Reading United AC is an American soccer team based in Reading, Pennsylvania. Founded in 1995, the team plays in USL League Two, the fourth tier of the American Soccer Pyramid.

The club plays its home games at Don Thomas Stadium on the campus of Exeter Township Senior High School. The club's colors are white, black, gold, and navy blue. United formerly fielded a team in the Super-20 League, a league for players seventeen to twenty years of age under the United Soccer Leagues umbrella.

Prior to the 2010 season, the team was known as the Reading Rage. On December 21, 2009, the Rage organization announced its agreement with Major League Soccer's Philadelphia Union to become their official minor league affiliate, and re-branded as Reading United A.C. with immediate effect.

Reading United is one of only three teams in USL League Two history to reach consecutive league finals - reaching in 2018 and 2019.

The team has had a great deal of success promoting amateur players to the professional ranks, with over 130 former players having gone on to either play professionally, cap for their country in international play, or be drafted by an MLS team.

History

The Reading-American Soccer Club was established in the early 1900s under the name of Germania Soccer Club by a group of German immigrant soccer players and soccer enthusiasts. On April 26, 1926 Germania merged with the Reading Liederkranz (Reading's German-American club), and the Sport Club legally became the Sports Division of the Reading Liederkranz.

Later, under the direction of Germania and Liederkranz members Werner Kraheck and Peter Weiss, the Reading Berks Junior Soccer League was born, providing a foundation for local youth soccer clubs to flourish. The Germania teams were the precursor to the now common “premier” teams. After the Germania program ended in the late 1970s/early 1980s, the premier teams became the Reading Berks Select program whereby each club could send several of their “top players” to participate in tournaments and training but then return them to their club teams. After several iterations, the Reading Berks Select teams became known as Reading Berks United, later RBU, and finally Berks Soccer Academy aka B.S.A. Rage.

Many people in the greater Reading area are surprised to learn that the Reading United A.C. (formerly Reading Rage) is the 2nd longest tenured minor league team in the area (behind the R-Phils). Berks Professional Sports introduced the Reading Rage minor league team 15 years ago with a squad that featured a great blend of local talent and “imported” stars. The Reading Rage would not have begun without the efforts of former Penn State All-American Archie Moylan. Archie was playing professional soccer and featured as a player and General Manager for the Philadelphia Freedom. Archie worked tirelessly to recruit an ownership team and staff. In 1996 his dream took the field. While a lot of the players, staff and even owners of the original team moved on, Archie's dream stayed alive. The Rage teams of the 1990s did well, with Archie leading the team to the playoffs in their 2nd season, and capturing a D3 Pro League (precursor to today's USL2) Mid-Atlantic Division Crown in 1997. Archie Moylan continued to build the Rage brand, and the team was rewarded for his management efforts by being named Franchise of the Year. In 1998 Archie further expanded his roles as he took over as head coach of the 3rd year program. The Rage teams of the 1990s featured a lot of local talent including former Wilson H.S. stars Ed Sep, Matt Wolf, Chris Arthur, and Drew Kauffman; Weiser stars Tom Auchenbach and Steve Thomas; and of course Fleetwood greats Keith Schlegel and former US Men's National Team member Troy Snyder. The team played at Fleetwood H.S. for two years prior to transitioning to Central Catholic Stadium in St. Lawrence, where they played for a number of years before moving to Albright College and finally at Exeter's Don Thomas Stadium.

Tragically, Archie was diagnosed with cancer and died in 2000. In recognition of Archie's efforts and accomplishments, the United Soccer Leagues has established The Archie Moylan Award to honor a member of the USL family who has exhibited outstanding humanitarian qualities or overcome extraordinary adversity in hopes to give back to the soccer community through their actions and deeds.  Past winners include executive Marcie Laumann with the Hampton Roads Piranhas (W-League), player Todd Elkins for the Southern California Seahorses (PDL), and player, coach, and USL staff member, Stuart Bracher.  Each of these individuals has exemplified the ability to not only overcome adversity but transform it into an opportunity to effectuate positive change by serving as an inspiration to others. This year's honoree was Betsy McAdams. McAdams died in June of brain cancer. She was an original employee of the Charleston Battery since its inception in 1993 and went on to serve in a number of roles including Director of Operations and Director of Finance & Business Administration. She was named Chief Operating Officer in May 2008. USL renamed the Key Grip Award to the Betsy McAdams award because she defined the behind the scenes employee.

Due to the loss of Archie, a string of losing years, and decreasing fan attendance, in 2004 the team transitioned from the Pro Soccer League (USL2) to the rapidly growing PDL. The pro-am PDL allowed focus on younger players and generally less overhead and costs for franchise operations. After some internal shuffling and under the stewardship of owner and general manager Jerry Wojton, the team regained in strength, with Jerry eventually landing seasoned English Club Crystal Palace's Academy Director Derek Broadley to coach the team in 2005. Derek brought his passion for player development and quickly reignited local interest in the team and league with his attractive style of play and confidence in his coaching methodologies. While Derek's team's hovered around .500, he returned the Rage teams to the winning side of things, posting a 7–5–4 2007 record. One of the players Derek introduced to the Reading Rage in 2007 was a central defender from Boston College, Brendan Burke. Derek left the Reading Rage in the fall of 2007 to take over the Bermuda National team position.

On January 13, 2011, Reading United saw four former players, including three from the 2010 roster, drafted at the 2011 MLS SuperDraft in Baltimore, Maryland.  2011 MLS Rookie of the Year C. J. Sapong was selected 10th overall by Sporting Kansas City, followed by Corey Hertzog who was selected 13th overall by New York Red Bulls.  Levi Houapeu was selected in the third round by Philadelphia Union with the 41st pick overall.  Former Reading Rage player, Zarek Valentin, was selected 4th overall by Chivas USA.

In 2012, three more alumni were selected in the 2012 MLS SuperDraft, held in Kansas City, MO.  Andrew Wenger became the United's first alumnus to be selected with the #1 overall pick by the Montreal Impact.  Defender Matt Hedges was selected soon after by FC Dallas with the #11 overall pick.  For the second straight year, the Philadelphia Union picked a United alum, picking Raymon Gaddis in the 2nd round of the draft. Probable Generation Adidas signings Billy Schuler and Brian "Cobi" Span were likely first round picks, but chose to sign overseas rather than enter the MLS SuperDraft.

Four other former players were also selected during the 2012 MLS Supplemental Draft, including Dawyne Smith (#3 by the New England Revolution), Brian Ownby (#7 by the Houston Dynamo), Evans Frimpong (#9 by the Chicago Fire), and Christian Barreiro (#50 by the New York Red Bulls).

Just over a week after the Supplemental Draft (January 25, 2012), former keeper Jeremy Vuolo signed a professional contract with the New York Red Bulls, after spending his first professional season abroad with Finland's AC Oulu.

On December 28, 2013, Reading United announced that David Castellanos was chosen as the club's head coach for the 2014 season.

Name, colors, and badge
The primary colors of Reading United A.C. are black, gold, and navy blue. The black and gold derive from Reading's civic seal and to the colors of the Germania Liederkranz, one of the area's original soccer clubs. Navy and gold represent the traditional state colors of Pennsylvania.

The logo for Reading United A.C. includes a stylized train that alludes to the famous Reading Railroad, which was one of the first railroads in the United States. The train depiction contains a soccer ball encircled by 11 bolts, symbolizing the 11 players on a soccer field. The shamrocks are a tribute to an Irishman named Paul "Archie" Moylan, the Reading Rage's former team captain, general manager, and coach, who died of cancer in 2000.

The secondary logo features a keystone, a symbol used officially by the Commonwealth of Pennsylvania alluding to its colonial designation as the "Keystone State."

"United" is a common soccer appellation used in the British Isles and represents its relationship to the Philadelphia Union. The initials A.C. stand for "Athletic Club", which indicates the team's goal of expanding its business to incorporate other sports and fitness programs.

Players

Current roster
.

Notable former players

This list of notable former players comprises players who went on to play professional soccer after playing for the team in the Premier Development League, or those who previously played professionally before joining the team.

  Christian Barreiro
  Will Bates
  Alex Bono
  Rayane Boukemia
  Deshorn Brown
  Tyrell Burgess
  Ian Christianson
  Adam Clay
  Greg Cochrane
  Joey Dezart
  Alex Dixon
  J. T. Dorsey
  Leo Fernandes
  Ryan Finley
  Mark Forrest
  Evans Frimpong
  Ray Gaddis
  Adam Gazda
  Matt Hedges
  Ian Hennessy
  Corey Hertzog
  David Horst
  Levi Houapeu
  Scott Krotee
  Simon Lefebvre
  Damion Lowe
  Connor Maloney
  Mo Adams
  JJ Williams
  Paul Marie
  Napo Matsoso
  John McCarthy
  Luke Mulholland
  Steve Neumann
  Jimmy Ockford
  Stephen Okai
  Brian Ownby
  Jelani Peters
  Frantzdy Pierrot
  Jeremy Rafanello
  Pedro Ribeiro
  C. J. Sapong
  Chad Severs
  Billy Schuler
  Dawyne Smith
  Brian Span
  Sheldon Sullivan
  Ben Sweat
  Zarek Valentin
  Jeremy Vuolo
  Andrew Wenger
  Aaron Wheeler
  Jason Yeisley
  Zach Zandi
  Kamal Miller
  Ben Lundt
Irad Young, American-Israeli

Year-by-year

Honors
1997
D3Pro Mid Atlantic Division Champions
Franchise of the Year

2008
PDL Mid-Atlantic Division Champions
PDL Eastern Conference Regular Season Champions
PDL National Semifinalists
All-League: Adam Gazda

2009
PDL Mid-Atlantic Division Champions
PDL Regular Season National Champions
PDL Player of the Year: Aaron Wheeler
All-PDL: Aaron Wheeler
All-Eastern Conference: Aaron Wheeler, Adam Gazda
All-PDL: Aaron Wheeler
USL Marketing Award

2010 
PDL Mid-Atlantic Division Champions
PDL Eastern Conference Champions
PDL National Semifinalists
All-PDL: Matt Hedges
PDL Defender of the Year Finalist: Matt Hedges
PDL Coach of the Year Finalist: Brendan Burke
All-Eastern Conference: CJ Sapong, Luke Mulholland, Matt Hedges

2011
PDL Rookie of the Year Finalist: Brian Holt
All-Eastern Conference: Stephen Okai, Matthew Baker, Brian Holt
PDL Communication Award

2012 
PDL Top Goalscorer: Deshorn Brown (13 goals)
2012 All-PDL: Deshorn Brown
2012 All-Eastern Conference: Deshorn Brown, Stephen Okai, Greg Cochrane

2013 
All-Eastern Conference: Jason Plumhoff, Damion Lowe
All-PDL: Jason Plumhoff, Damion Lowe
PDL Communication Award

2014
All-Eastern Conference: Alex Bono
PDL Goalkeeper of the Year Finalist: Alex Bono

2016
Mid-Atlantic Division Champions
All-Eastern Conference: Paul Marie

2017
All-Eastern Conference: Aaron Molloy
All-Eastern Conference Honorable Mention: Alexandre Bouillennec, Lamine Conte, Frantzdy Pierrot
All-PDL: Aaron Molloy
Young Player of the Year: Aaron Molloy

2018 
PDL Mid Atlantic Division Champions
PDL Eastern Conference Champions
PDL Finalist
All-PDL: Aaron Molloy
All-Eastern Conference: Aaron Molloy, Khori Bennett, Kamal Miller, Bennett Strutz
PDL Franchise of the Year
PDL Coach of the Year: Alan McCann
PDL Volunteer of the Year: Jeff Blankenbiller

2019 
USL League Two Mid Atlantic Division Champions
USL League Two Eastern Conference Champions
USL League Two Finalist
USL League Two Defender of the Year: Lamine Conte
All-USL League Two: Lamine Conte, Felipe Hideki
All-Eastern Conference: Lamine Conte, Felipe Hideki
Playoffs: 1996, 1997, 1998, 1999, 2000, 2001, 2004, 2008, 2009, 2010, 2011, 2012, 2013, 2014, 2016, 2017, 2018, 2019
Division Champions: 1997, 2008, 2009, 2010, 2016, 2018, 2019
National Semifinalists: 2008, 2010
National Finalists: 2018, 2019
Eastern Conference Runner-up: 2016
US Open Cup Qualifiers: 2001, 2003, 2009, 2010, 2011, 2012, 2013, 2014, 2015, 2016, 2017, 2018, 2019

Coaches
  Mike Moyer (1996–1997)
  Archie Moylan (1998–2000)
  Eric Puls (2001–2002)
  Seamus O'Connor (2003–2004)
  Derek Broadley (2005–2007)
  Brendan Burke (2008–2013)
  David Castellanos (2014–2015)
  Stephen Hogan (2016–2017)
  Alan McCann (2018–2020)
  Casey Moore (2021–present)

Stadia
 Stadium at Fleetwood High School; Fleetwood, Pennsylvania (1996-1997, 2003)
 St. Lawrence Stadium at Central Catholic High School; Reading, Pennsylvania (1998-2002)
 Gene L. Shirk Stadium at Albright College; Reading, Pennsylvania (2004, 2012)
 Don Thomas Stadium at Exeter Township Senior High School; Reading, Pennsylvania (2005–2011, 2013, 2015–2017, 2021)
 Stadium at Oley Valley High School; Oley Valley, Pennsylvania 2 games (2011, 2013)
 Gurski Stadium at Wilson High School; Reading, Pennsylvania (2014, 2018–2019)
 Stadium at Alvernia University; Reading, Pennsylvania (2022-pres)

References

External links
Official Site
Official PDL site

Association football clubs established in 1995
USL League Two teams
Amateur soccer teams in Pennsylvania
Soccer clubs in Pennsylvania
USL Second Division teams
Sports in Reading, Pennsylvania
1995 establishments in Pennsylvania